Weerapullige Jayasiri (born May 1, 1947 as ඩබ්ලිව්. ජයසිරි) [Sinhala]), popularly known as W. Jayasiri, is a Sri Lankan actor in Sri Lankan cinema, stage drama and television. Highly versatile actor from drama to comedy, Jayasiri is a multi-talented personnel that working as a script writer and lyricist.

Personal life
W. Jayasiri was born in Hirimbura, Galle. He has three brothers. His first school is Kithulampitiya Central Girls' College. Then he moved into Matara, and studied at Sumangala Vidyalaya, Matara and then to St. Thomas' College, Matara until S.S.C exam. He was revoked from the school due to his misbehaviours and finally attended to Vidyaloka College, Galle. He was selected to University of Colombo for higher studies on Economics, Indian history and Sinhala. At the university, he engaged in several drama festivals and also worked as the editor of drama circle. At that time he organized drama festivals where he met Sugathapala de Silva, and became close friends.

After series of losses in drama career, he went Saudi Arabia for a work in US company. After few years, he returned and started to play in drama again. He is married and the couple has two daughters.

Acting career
Jaysiri is also a close friend of renowned director Dharmasena Pathiraja, at that time he used to play cameo roles in stage dramas. According to him, he started to play major roles only after turned 40 years of age. His maiden stage drama acting came through Harima badu Hayak second edition in 1966. He played roles in de Silva's popular stage dramas such as Dunna Dunugamuwa, Muthu Kumari and then in Pathiraja's Eya Dan Loku Lamyek. He became popular with the films Seilama  and Visidela, both directed by H. D. Premaratne.

His critically acclaimed stage drama acting came through stage drama Mara Sade in 1985, which is considered as a milestone in the Sinhala theater. He is the lyricist of popular film Bambaru Awith. In 2005, Jayasiri translated the television script Sanda Mudunata which was originally written by director Samy Pavel in French.

Selected stage dramas
 Dunna Dunugamuwa
 Muthu Kumari
 Eya Dan Loku Lamayek
 Dolahak
 Guti Kemata Niyamithai
 Dhawala Bheeshana
 No Return
 Makarakshaya
 Handa Nihanda

Selected television serials

 Adisi Nadiya 
Ado
 Akala Sandya
 Arungal
 Bim Kaluwara
 Dandubasnamanaya
 Dhawala Kanya 
 Dambulugala Sakmana 
 Gajamuthu
 Girikula
 Haye Pahara
 Idorayaka Mal Pipila
 Koombiyo
 Kumarayaneni 
 Laabai Apple
 Mage Kaviya Mata Denna 
 Manikkawatha 
 Mini Muthu
 Nagenahira Weralin Asena
 Neela Pabalu
 No Parking
 Nonagathayaka Nimawa
 Ran Kira Soya
 Sadgunakaraya
 Sanda Mudunata
 Sidu as Chief monk
 Sihina Samagama 
 Suddilage Kathawa 
 Tharu Ahasata Adarei
 Theth Saha Viyali 
 Thimiragira
 Thumpane 
 Uthuwankande Sura Saradiyel
 Valavettuwa
 Vishwanthari 
 Wanawadule Wasanthaya
 Wassana Sihinaya

Radio Play
  Tharuwan Saranai 

  Alayaka Damanaya

Controversy
In 2018, he refused to attend to attend the Kalabooshana state awards festival to protest the October 26 political conspiracy. In social media, he condemns the anti-democratic and anti-constitutional acts of president Maithripala Sirisena and receiving an award from such a person is disgusting to him.

Filmography
Jayasiri started his film career with a minor role in 1973 film Dahakin Ekak directed by Meril Albert. He contributed in several critically acclaimed films such as Seilama, Wisidela, Bawa Duka, Duwata Mawaka Misa, Sankranthi and Gamani.

Awards
He won a Presidential Film Award for the Best Supporting Actor for his role in the movie Duwata Mawaka Misa in 1997.

 Presidential Film Awards
1997 - Best Supporting Actor (Duwata Mawaka Misa)

 Derana Lux Film Awards
2012 - Best Supporting Actor (Gamani)

See also
 Cinema of Sri Lanka

References

External links
 To contest with a common symbol would be the proper way W. Jayasiri\
 ‘Sinethra’ focuses on yesteryear golden cinema
 V Day 2018: The violent results of patriarchal values take center stage on Sunday 1st April
 Remembering dramatist and writer Sugathapala de Silva
 වල්කමේ යන ගෑණු රඟපාන්න ඇවිල්ලා
 ඩිලාන්ලට එස්.බී.ලට කොන්දක් නැහැ – ඩබ්ලිව්. ජයසිරි
 The King Is Dead! Long Live The King!
 සුන්දර ගමක තැනෙන සිහින සක්මන ගැනයි මේ
 මල්සරා නෙවෙයි

Sri Lankan male film actors
Sinhalese male actors
Sri Lankan lyricists
Alumni of Vidyaloka College
People from Galle
Living people
1947 births